Mackilligin's gerbil (Dipodillus mackilligini) also known as Mackilligin's dipodil, is a species of rodent in the family Muridae. It occurs in the southeastern deserts of Egypt and Sudan, around the area of the Halaib Triangle. It has been grouped with Dipodillus nanus, but is now considered specifically distinct.

References

Further reading

Dipodillus
Rodents of North Africa
Mammals of the Middle East
Mammals described in 1904
Taxa named by Oldfield Thomas
Taxonomy articles created by Polbot
Taxobox binomials not recognized by IUCN